Pierre Candelo (9 April 1934 – 9 November 2020) was a French sports shooter. He competed in the trap event at the 1968 Summer Olympics.

References

1934 births
2020 deaths
French male sport shooters
Olympic shooters of France
Shooters at the 1968 Summer Olympics